The Spiritual Bonding is an album by Vidna Obmana, released in 1994 through Extreme Records.

Track listing

Personnel 
Musicians
Alio Die – instruments, recording
Vidna Obmana – instruments, arrangement, recording, photography
Djen Ajakan Shean – instruments
Robert Rich – instruments, recording
Steve Roach – instruments, production, mixing, recording
Production and additional personnel
Extreme Graphics – illustrations
Martine Verhoeven – photography

References

External links 
 

1994 albums
Extreme Records albums
Vidna Obmana albums